Web is a collaborative album by Bill Laswell and Terre Thaemlitz, released on January 24, 1995 by Subharmonic.

Track listing

Personnel 
Adapted from the Web liner notes.

Musicians
Bill Laswell – instruments, musical arrangements, producer
Terre Thaemlitz – instruments, musical arrangements, producer

Technical
Layng Martine – assistant engineer
Robert Musso – engineering

Release history

References

External links 
 
 Web at Bandcamp

1995 albums
Collaborative albums
Bill Laswell albums
Terre Thaemlitz albums
Albums produced by Bill Laswell
Subharmonic (record label) albums